Bangladesh Institute of Marine Technology (BIMT), in Narayanganj, is a state-supported institute that offers four-year higher level diploma programs, including a Diploma in Engineering Marine Technology and a Diploma in Engineering Shipbuilding Technology. BIMT also supports four different courses of study in engineering.

History 

The institute was established in 1958. It was known as the Marine Diesel Training Center (MDTC) since 1960. On December 10, 1979, it was renamed as Bangladesh Institute of Marine Technology.

Campus 
BIMT is situated on a  campus on the east bank of the Shitalakshya River in Bandar Upazila. Across the river lies the city of Narayanganj, most easily reached by boat. The Tribenee Canal marks the southern boundary of campus.

Workshop and laboratories 

The labs of physics and chemistry have been decorated nicely with many kinds of instrument. A student can easily learn how to take the measurement of different types of scale. Not only this but also the workshop is the best in our country. Powerful diesel engine, I.C. engine are available in this shop. It is needless to say that the welding shop of this institute is biggest in our country. A student gets lot of time for welding which help them to make a skill welder. CNC Lathe M/C, CNC cutting M/C also provide here. A big M/C shop with lathe, shaper grinding, drilling M/C are decorated well. TIG, MIG & MAG welding are arranged specially.

Hostel facility 

The student of the marine institute live in a nice hostel with a lot of facilities like current, water, a powerful generator is constant for students. Above 200 student can live together easily in the old hostel, other student live in the new hostel which is situated on the bank of the Shitalakshya River. A dining hall has been arranged and it operated by special cooker.

Library 
The library of this institute is the biggest one with the collection of technical books and also huge collection of the foreign books. Besides it students have a library by the help of student parliament.

Organization and administration 
The institute is controlled by the Bureau of Manpower, Employment and Training (BMET) under the Ministry of Expatriates Welfare and Overseas Employment.

Academics 
BIMT offers four-year courses of study; leading to such as  "Diploma in Engineering Marine Technology" & "Diploma in Engineering Shipbuilding Technology" Equivalent to Undergraduate Engineering. It also offers two-year trade courses:
 Marine Diesel Engine Artificer ( Equivalent to H.S.C.) 2 years National Diploma
 Ship Fabrication ( Equivalent to H.S.C.) 2 Years national Diploma
 Shipbuilding & Mechanical Draftsmanship ( Equivalent to H.S.C ) 2 Years National Diploma
 Shipbuilding Welding ( Equivalent to H.S.C ) 2 Years National Diploma

Scholarship and stipend 
Stipend are given every student for Diploma course BDT275.00 & for trade BDT250.00. For getting the stiffened every student must be present 80% in their class. When a student goes for "On the job training" Then they get BDT500.00 for Diploma and BDT450.00 for trade courses.

References

External links
 

Colleges in Bangladesh
Maritime colleges in Asia
Colleges in Narayanganj District
Education in Narayanganj
Educational institutions established in 1958
1958 establishments in East Pakistan